Osage Township is an inactive township in Dent County, in the U.S. state of Missouri.

Osage Township was established in 1866, taking its name from the Osage people.

References

Townships in Missouri
Townships in Dent County, Missouri